Lü Yue (born December 1957) is a Chinese cinematographer and film director.

Early life 
In December 1957, Lu was born in Tianjin, China.

Career 
Lü is today among the most important cinematographers of recent Chinese cinema, and is particularly well known for his collaborations with director Zhang Yimou with whom he served as director of photography in three films. Lü was nominated for an Academy Award for best cinematographer for Zhang's film Shanghai Triad. He has also served as cinematographer for other Fifth Generation directors such as Tian Zhuangzhuang (for 1985's On the Hunting Ground) as well as for older directors, such as Huang Shuqin (for 1994's A Soul Haunted by Painting). More recently he served as cinematographer for actress Joan Chen's directorial effort, Xiu Xiu: The Sent Down Girl, a film in which he also played a small part as the titular character's father.

Lü has also found measured success as director; his debut film, Mr. Zhao, was well-received, winning the Golden Leopard at the Locarno International Film Festival.

Filmography

As cinematographer

As director

Awards
Paris Anthropology Film Festival, 1990
Best Film for Nujiang, La Vallée Perdue
Camerimage Awards, 1995
Golden Frog for Shanghai Triad (nominated)
48th Cannes Film Festival, 1995
Best Technology Award for Shanghai Triad
Los Angeles Film Critics Association Awards, 1995
Best Cinematography for Shanghai Triad
New York Film Critics Circle Awards, 1995
Best Cinematography for Shanghai Triad
67th Academy Awards, 1996
Best Cinematography for Shanghai Triad (nominated)
68th Oscar Awards, 1996
Best Cinematography for Shanghai Triad (nominated)
Locarno International Film Festival, 1998
Golden Leopard for Mr. Zhao
AFI Fest, 1998
Grand Jury Prize for Mr. Zhao (nominated)
19th Tokyo International Film Festival, 2006
Special Jury Prize for Thirteen Princess Trees
7th Asia Pacific Screen Awards, 2013
Achievement in Cinematography for Back to 1942
Festival Internationale del Film Di Roma AIC, 2012
Best Cinematography Award for Back to 1942

References

External links

Lü Yue at the Chinese Movie Database
Lü Yue at the BFI Film and Television Database
Lü Yue biography from the 1998 Locarno Film Festival

1957 births
Living people
Chinese cinematographers
Film directors from Tianjin
Beijing Film Academy alumni
Chinese film directors